The Mangarh Hills are part of the Aravali Range situated in  Rajasthan. They are known for the memorial site of the Mangarh Massacre.

it was happand on 17 nov 1913, that we  called mangarh massacre   and  it is situated in banswada district of rajasthan.

References

Aravalli Range
Hills of Gujarat
Hills of Rajasthan